The Malta Tanks was a unit designation for an independent Royal Tank Regiment (RTR) unit made of a mixture of British tank types deployed to Malta in World War 2.

Role and Deployment History 
The first armoured unit destined for Malta was organised in 1940. Unit was formed with strength of 5 officers and 62 other ranks; and was attached to 44th Battalion RTR prior to its embarkation for Malta; the unit was part of Malta Command.

On 28 November 1940 1 Independent Troop, 44 RTR (commanded by Captain R E H Drury) arrived on the Island on Convoy R.45. The Troop's heavy equipment included:
 Four Matilda Infantry Tanks (nicknamed: Faulknor, Gallant, Greyhound, Griffin)
 Two Vickers Mk VIB Light Tanks
 Four Motorcycles
 Four Bedford OXD 30-cwt lorries
 Two 15-cwt trucks
 One 15-cwt truck (water bowser)
 One Car Utility.

1942 the tanks of A Squadron 6 Battalion RTR (which had sailed from Alexandria) arrived on the Island. By 30 June 1942 the British armour was organised thus:
 One Troop of Vickers Light Tanks
 Two Troops of Cruiser Tanks
 One Troop of Matilda Tanks

The A Squadron 6 RTR group was made up of 3 officers (Major S D G Longworth, Lt K J H Macdonald and 2Lt J Stiddard and 79 other ranks.

On 21 Dec 1942 A Squadron, 6 Royal Tank Regiment amalgamated with the Malta Tank Troop and is referred to was reported as “Malta Tanks” with effect from this date. The whole unit remained under Central Infantry Brigade for administration. Malta Tanks was commanded by Major S D G Longworth. X Squadron had set sail with 13 A13 Cruiser tanks but five were lost when the ship carrying them struck a mine and sank. Other tanks (Valentines) also arrived in 1942.

The unit never became larger than 19 vehicles and did not see action. It spent the war patrolling, boosting morale across central Malta and acting as tugs removing damaged aircraft from runways.

Equipment 
Malta Tanks was equipped with five types of tank during its time on the Island.

See also 
 Siege of Malta (World War II)
 Operation Herkules
 44th Royal Tank Regiment
 6th Royal Tank Regiment

References

External links 
 Imperial War Museum Photographic Archive
 R E H Drury's military service record

Royal Tank Regiment
Military history of Malta